Circled a, @, Ⓐ, (A), or variation may refer to:

 At sign (@), used in email/twitter/instagram addresses, macro signifiers, prices
 Anarchist symbol, the A overscribed with a circle
 The trademark on the radiators of Atkinson lorries
 Enclosed A (ⓐ,Ⓐ), an "A" inscribed inside a circle, a typographic character, see Enclosed Alphanumerics
 United States Third Army, whose shoulder insignia is an A in a circle.
 @ (album), a 2013 album by John Zorn and Thurston Moore
 @ (unit), a custom unit (arroba)

See also
 A (disambiguation)